The World Radio TV Handbook, also known as WRTH, is a directory of virtually every radio and TV station on Earth, published yearly. The importance of the book has greatly diminished with the online availability of up-to-date frequency informations.

It was started in 1947 by Oluf Lund Johansen (1891–1975) as the World Radio Handbook (WRH). The word "TV" was added to the title in 1965, when Jens M. Frost (1919–1999) took over as editor. It had then already included data for television broadcasting for some years. After the 40th edition in 1986, Frost handed over editorship to Andrew G. (Andy) Sennitt.

History 
The first edition that bears an edition number is the 4th edition, published in 1949. The three previous editions appear to have been:
 the 1st edition, marked "Winter Ed. 1947" on the cover and completed in November 1947
 the 2nd edition, marked "1948 (May-November)" on the cover and completed in May 1948
 the 3rd edition, marked "1948-49" on the cover and completed in November 1948.

Summer Supplements appear to have been issued from 1959 through 1971. From 1959 through 1966 they were called the Summer Supplement. From 1967 through 1971 they were called the Summer Edition.

Through the 1969 edition, the WRTH indicated the date on which the manuscript was completed.

Issues with covers in Danish are known to have been available for the years 1948 May-November (2d ed.), 1950-51 (5th ed.; cover and 1st page in Danish, rest in English, most ads in Danish), 1952 (6th ed.; cover and 1st page in Danish, rest in English, most ads in Danish), and probably others. The 1952 English ed., which is completely in English, has an extra page with world times and agents, and ads in English which are sometimes different from the ads in the Danish edition. Also, the 1953 ed. mentions the availability of a German edition.

Oluf Lund Johansen published, in conjunction with Libreria Hispanoamericana of Barcelona, Spain, a softbound Spanish-language version of the 1960 WRTH. The book was printed in Spain and called Guia Mundial de Radio y Television, and carried the WRTH logo at the time as well as all the editorial references contained in the English-language version. 

Hardbound editions are known to have been available for the years 1963 through 1966, 1968, 1969, and 1975-1978, and probably others.

Publications 
 Various authors World Radio TV Handbook 75th ed. 2021, WRTH Publications Limited, 2020 .

References

External links 
 

Radio organizations
Television organizations
International broadcasting
Directories
Publications established in 1945
Reference publishers
Annual publications
1945 non-fiction books
Book series introduced in 1945